Anna Klein is the name of:

Anna Klein (painter) (1883-1941), German painter and designer
Anna Klein (camp warden) (1900-?), guard at the Ravensbrück concentration camp

See also
Anne Klein (disambiguation)